The tangmuri, ka tangmuri in the Khasi language, is a double-reed conical-bore wind-instrument used by the Hynniew Trep people of Meghalaya State in North-East India.

The tangmuri is used by musicians playing for traditional dances, and for other traditional rituals, such as cremations performed according to the indigenous religion, Niam Khasi. The tangmuri delivers a very high pitched sound when played by the musician.

Description
The instrument consists of a turned conical-bore wooden chanter, about 20cm long, with seven finger-holes on the front, and a separate flared turned 15cm long wooden bell which is attached to the chanter by a push-fit.
The double-reed is tied onto a thin conical-bore metal tube c.3cm long, which is wound with thread to hold it in place in the chanter.

Gallery

References

Indian musical instruments
Double-reed instruments